The New York/New Jersey Juggernaut were a women's professional softball team based in Central Islip, New York.  They were founding members of National Pro Fastpitch and were founded in 2004.  They were sold in 2005 and renamed the New York Juggernaut.  The team folded shortly after the 2005 season concluded.  In 2013, the second NPF franchise to represent the region was created called the New York/New Jersey Comets.

Key players
Erika Hanson
Michele Smith

Franchise history

2004

2005

Season-by-season 

|-
|2004 || 39 || 21 || 0 || 3rd place National Pro Fastpitch || Won 2004 NPF Championship
|-
|2005 || 31 || 14 || 0 || 4th place National Pro Fastpitch || Lost to Chicago in NPF semi-finals
|-
!Totals || 70 || 35 || 0
|colspan="2"|

Moments

27 Inning game vs. NE Riptide

Players
Kacy Clark
Amanda Scott
Erika Hanson
Lindsay Klein
Courtney Scott
Kelli Wilkerson
Lisa Iancin
Lauren Bauer

References

External links 
 
 The Softball Channel

 
  

Softball teams
Sports clubs established in 2004
2004 establishments in New Jersey
Defunct softball teams in the United States
Defunct National Pro Fastpitch teams
Defunct sports teams in New Jersey
Defunct sports teams in New York (state)
New York/New Jersey Juggernaut